Kurt Thune (born 18 August 1953) is a Finnish sports shooter. He competed in two events at the 1988 Summer Olympics. Born in Sweden, Thune moved to Finland in 1983, and before the 1988 Olympics, he represented Sweden in competitions.

References

1953 births
Living people
Finnish male sport shooters
Olympic shooters of Finland
Shooters at the 1988 Summer Olympics
Sport shooters from Stockholm
Finnish people of Swedish descent
Swedish emigrants to Finland